Hunt Down the Freeman is a 2018 first-person shooter video game. Developed by Royal Rudius Entertainment, it is an independently developed unofficial installment to the Half-Life franchise.

The game was released to a negative reception, receiving criticism for its numerous bugs, perceived poor design, and allegations of copyright infringement.

Gameplay
Hunt Down the Freeman is a single-player first-person shooter in which players take control of Sergeant Mitchell Shephard. The game features similar mechanics to other games within the Half-Life series, while differing in the type of weapons used. Uniquely, it uses a parkour mechanic, which the player can use to scale pipes, crates, and other large objects.

Plot

United States Marine Corps Sergeant Mitchell Shephard (Mick Lauer) is sent to the Black Mesa Research Facility to cover up an alien invasion. There, he is attacked and severely injured by a man whom Shephard believes to be Gordon Freeman. He awakens on a hospital bed and is confronted by the G-Man (Evan Kascinde), who cryptically promises Shephard an unspecified reward in exchange for killing Freeman "when the time comes". 

Waking up in Albuquerque, New Mexico some time later, Shephard discovers it to be under a full-scale invasion from the Combine. After linking up with a National Guardsman named Alex (Alexander Beltman), Shephard traverses the city, reluctantly partnering with black operations agent Adam (Vincent Cyr) along the way. Shephard eventually makes contact with a group of Army Rangers led by Colonel Cue (Michael Green), before discovering from a radio broadcast that the United States has surrendered to the Combine. The group decides to flee to Nevada; however, the train they use is attacked by the Combine with Shephard, Alex and Adam being the only survivors. There, they link up with another group of Rangers led by Lieutenant Harvey (Jonathan Benlolo), and escape with them to the Pacific Northwest. Coming across a port, Shephard finds the container ship Avalon Vale and its captain, Roosevelt (Oliver Colton). The ship is attacked by the Combine, killing Roosevelt; Shephard takes control of the survivors and forms his own private army operating out of a series of oil platforms. 

Three years later, Shephard travels to City 9 in Alaska and discovers a Combine factory operated with child slavery. After negotiating with the factory's administrator, Boris (Vincent Fallow), Shephard rescues them and brings them back to his outposts. Seventeen years after that, the G-Man instructs Shephard to travel to City 17 and kill Freeman. Together with Adam, Shephard allies with the Combine and attacks the Resistance base at Black Mesa East. After the attack, he is captured by the Resistance before being rescued by Boris' daughter Sasha (Eli Walker). Adam suddenly appears and kills Sasha, urging Shephard to run. After escaping the Resistance, Shephard confronts the G-Man, who reveals that Adam was the one who attacked him at Black Mesa as part of a deal between the two. The G-Man goes on to explain that Shephard's actions have weakened the Combine, allowing Freeman to defeat them. Shephard then proceeds towards a factory overseen by Boris, who mistakenly believes that he killed Sasha and orders the Combine to kill him; however, Shephard defeats their forces before returning to the Avalon Vale. Discovering that Adam has attempted to assume control over his army, Shephard confronts and executes him before directing the ship to set sail for a stranded research vessel named the Borealis.

Development and release
Hunt Down the Freeman began as a modification for Half-Life 2. Despite this, development on Hunt Down the Freeman commenced, and a demo of the game was released in 2016. Following the game's full release in 2018, achievements were added a year later.

Reception
Hunt Down the Freeman garnered a poor critical reception. Rock Paper Shotgun expressed that the game's ideas "seem nice on paper but are executed poorly", citing several haphazard gameplay functions and storyline moments. PC Gamer described the experience as akin to "an unfinished mod project with rudimentary level design", stating that they doubted even planned bug fixes "would make up for the general quality of the FPS levels I played", although they were impressed by its initial cutscenes.

The game was panned by players, with hundreds of negative reviews and critical Let's Play videos across YouTube, including continued accusations of copyright infringement. The game's developers denied these allegations, claiming that all assets were used with permission. However, they admitted that the game had numerous technical issues, attributing them to an incomplete build being released to the public by accident. They also suggested in another statement that its release was intentionally rushed to counter the already negative reputation the game had received from the community. One of the developers claimed that they and several other employees were not adequately paid for their work, with some receiving substantially less money and others receiving no payment at all. They further described the whole development process as poorly coordinated and "kind of a clusterfuck".

References

External links

 Official website (archived)

2018 video games
Alien invasions in video games
Apocalyptic video games
Fangames
First-person shooters
Half-Life (series)
Interquel video games
Fiction about resurrection
Science fiction video games
Single-player video games
Source (game engine) mods
Steam Greenlight games
Video game memes
Video games about revenge
Video games about the United States Marine Corps
Video games developed in the United States
Video games involved in plagiarism controversies
Video games set in Alaska
Video games set in California
Video games set in Eastern Europe
Video games set in New Mexico
Video games set in the 2000s
Video games set in the 2020s
War video games set in the United States
Windows games
Windows-only games
Source (game engine) games